The Men's downhill competition of the 1964 Winter Olympics at Innsbruck, Austria, was held at Patscherkofel on Thursday, 30 January. The defending world champion was Karl Schranz of Austria, and defending Olympic champion Jean Vuarnet of France had retired from competition.

The race course had a number of casualties during training runs, including the death of Ross Milne of Australia, which led to a label of "Course of Fear." Zimmermann was favored by many to win the downhill and to the delight of the Austrian fans he won by 0.74 seconds.

Following the victory, Zimmerman was featured on the cover of Sports Illustrated in the United States.

A dozen years later in 1976, Franz Klammer raced on a slightly shorter course (by ) and shaved more than 32 seconds off of Zimmerman's time to famously win the Olympic downhill.

Results

References

External links
FIS results

1964
Men's alpine skiing at the 1964 Winter Olympics
Winter Olympics